United Nations Security Council Resolution 312, adopted on February 4, 1972, after reaffirming previous resolutions on the topic and deploring those who failed to conform to them the Council called upon Portugal to immediately recognize the right of the peoples of her colonies to self-determination, to cease all acts of repression against the peoples of Angola, Mozambique and Guinea (Bissau), to withdraw its armed forces from those areas, to promulgate an unconditional political amnesty and to transfer power to freely elected native representative institutions.

The Council then called upon states to refrain from offering the Portuguese government any military assistance which would enable it to continue to repress the peoples of its territories and requested the Secretary-General to follow the implementation of the present resolution and report back from time to time.

Resolution 312 passed with nine votes and six abstentions from Argentina, Belgium, France, Italy, the United Kingdom and United States.

See also
 List of United Nations Security Council Resolutions 301 to 400 (1971–1976)
 Portuguese Empire
 Portuguese Colonial War

References
Text of the Resolution at undocs.org

External links
 

 0312
20th century in Portugal
 0312
 0312
 0312
 0312
Portuguese Angola
Portuguese Mozambique
Portuguese Colonial War
Portuguese Guinea
February 1972 events